Arthur Archer (1874–1940) was an English professional association footballer who played as a full back. Born in Derby, Archer made 170 appearances in all competitions for Small Heath in a five-year career, including over 150 games in the Football League, as well as playing for a variety of other clubs. When he finished playing he coached in Germany, Italy and Belgium, as well as a brief spell in England with Watford.

Honours
Small Heath
 Second Division runners up: 1900–01

References

1874 births
1940 deaths
Footballers from Derby
English footballers
Association football fullbacks
Burton Wanderers F.C. players
Birmingham City F.C. players
Gillingham F.C. players
Nunhead F.C. players
Queens Park Rangers F.C. players
Tottenham Hotspur F.C. players
Norwich City F.C. players
Brighton & Hove Albion F.C. players
Millwall F.C. players
English Football League players
Watford F.C. non-playing staff
Date of birth missing
Date of death missing
Place of death missing